Patrick Roy (August 30, 1957 – May 3, 2011) was a French politician, a member of the National Assembly.  He represented the 19th constituency of the Nord département, and was a member of the French Socialist Party (PSF). He was also the mayor of Denain.

He was known for the colorful clothes he wore at the National Assembly and his love of heavy metal music, a musical style he defended on various occasions during the debates concerning the Hadopi law or the controversy about the Hellfest festival. On 5 June 2010, he joined the French metal band Mass Hysteria on stage during the Metallurgicales festival in Denain.

In November 2010, Roy revealed that he was suffering from a digestive cancer. In February 2011 he announced that he would come back to the National Assembly on March 15 and he did it, thanking the other congresswomen and congressmen for their support.

Patrick Roy died in Valenciennes on 3 May 2011 from pancreatic cancer. He was 53.

References

1957 births
2011 deaths
People from Denain
Politicians from Hauts-de-France
Socialist Party (France) politicians
Deputies of the 12th National Assembly of the French Fifth Republic
Deputies of the 13th National Assembly of the French Fifth Republic
Deaths from cancer in France
Deaths from pancreatic cancer